Leonori is an Italian surname. Notable people with the surname include:

 Aristide Leonori (1856–1928), Italian architect and engineer
 Pietro Giovanni Leonori (active 1400), Italian painter of the Bolognese school
 Robert G. L. Leonori (1820–1905), American artist

Italian-language surnames